Coreocarpus arizonicus, the little lemonhead, is a North American species of flowering plants in the daisy family native to northwestern Mexico and the southwestern United States.  It has been found in southern Arizona (Pima, Santa Cruz, Cochise Counties), and in the adjacent Mexican States of Sonora, Chihuahua, Sinaloa, and Baja California Sur.

Coreocarpus arizonicus is a branching perennial subshrub up to 120 cm (48 inches) tall. The plant usually produces several flower heads, each head having yellow disc florets and white, purplish, yellow, or orange ray florets. Sometimes the ray florets are missing. The species grows in open sites along streams and in mountain canyons.

Varieties
 Coreocarpus arizonicus var. arizonicus - Arizona, Sonora, Chihuahua, Baja California Sur
 Coreocarpus arizonicus var. filiformis (Greenm.) S.F.Blake - Sinaloa
 Coreocarpus arizonicus var. macrophyllus Sherff - Chihuahua
 Coreocarpus arizonicus var. pubescens (B.L.Rob. & Fernald) S.F.Blake - Sonora
 Coreocarpus arizonicus var. sanpedroensis (E.B.Sm.) B.L.Turner - Sonora

References

Coreopsideae
Plants described in 1882
Flora of Northwestern Mexico
Flora of Arizona